Ernest W. Moore (1869 – after 1894) was an English professional footballer who played in the Football League for Small Heath. He played as a left back.

Moore was born in Birmingham. He played for Sparkhill Alliance before joining Birmingham of the Second Division in 1893. He made a promising start in the United Counties League, a secondary competition, but when the club signed Sid Oliver, he slipped down the pecking order. The only game he played in the Football League, on 29 December 1894, a 3–0 home win against Liverpool, was when Oliver was injured, and he returned to local football with Hockley Hill in 1895.

References

1869 births
Year of death missing
Footballers from Birmingham, West Midlands
English footballers
Association football fullbacks
Birmingham City F.C. players
English Football League players
Date of birth missing
Place of death missing